John Eeles (1658–1722) was an Anglican priest in Ireland in the late 17th and early 18th centuries.

Eeles was born in Berkshire and educated at Trinity College, Dublin.  A Prebendary of Tullaghorton in Lismore Cathedral, Ireland, he was appointed Archdeacon of Lismore in 1686. He was Chancellor of Waterford from 1691  to 1699; and Dean of Waterford from until his death in 1722.

References

Alumni of Trinity College Dublin
Archdeacons of Lismore
Deans of Waterford
1658 births
1722 deaths
17th-century Irish Anglican priests
18th-century Irish Anglican priests
People from Berkshire